Peter Sabroe (23 January 1867 – 26 July 1913) was a Danish journalist, politician, and children's rights advocate. 

Sabroe was born near Silkeborg, but moved to Copenhagen as a 14-year-old to take up an apprenticeship as a shoemaker. He soon became a social democrat and a member of a group of radicals called the Karl Marx Club. In 1887, he became a journalist at a provincial newspaper, in Randers, moving the next year to the paper Demokraten in the larger town Aarhus, where he eventually served as editor, from 1895 to 1908. Moving then to Kolding, he became editor of the Kolding Socialdemokrat from 1908 to 1910. He spent the rest of his life in Copenhagen, where he worked at the Social-Demokraten from 1910 to 1913.

Sabroe first took an elected office in 1900, as a member of the Aarhus town council, a position he held until 1909. He also served in the Folketinget, from 1901 to 1913. As a politician, Sabroe took the part of the common man, and was perhaps the best known and most controversial left-wing legislator of his time. He often traveled around Denmark, drawing attention to the conditions in which children lived and worked. 

Sabroe died in the Bramminge train accident in 1913.

Legacy
After his death, a fund was raised in his honor, and  used to maintain a children's home. Every year, a prize is awarded in his honor (the Peter Sabroe prize) to persons or institutions who have made an important contribution to improving the lives of children in Denmark.

External links 
 

19th-century Danish journalists
20th-century Danish journalists
19th-century Danish newspaper editors
20th-century Danish newspaper editors
1867 births
1913 deaths
Members of the Folketing
Railway accident deaths in Denmark
Aarhus municipal council members
Burials at Nordre Cemetery
People from Silkeborg
Politicians from Aarhus